Patrizia van der Weken (Born 12 November 1999) is a Luxembourgian sprinter who is a national record holder in the 100 metres and 200 metres events. She competed at the 2021 European Athletics U23 Championships, where she reached the final in the 100 metres. 

Van der Weken participated in the 2023 European Athletics Indoor Championships, where she won her heat but was ultimately eliminated in the semifinals.

Competition Record

Personal Bests 
Outdoor

 100 metres – 11.29 NR (La Chaux-de-Fonds, 2022)
 200 metres – 23.94 NR (La Chaux-de-Fonds, 2021)
Indoor

 60 metres – 7.21 NR (Beograd, 2022)

References

External Links 
Patrizia van der Weken at World Athletics

1997 births
Living people
21st-century Luxembourgian women
Luxembourgian female sprinters